Caishikou Station is an interchange subway station between Line 4 and Line 7 of the Beijing Subway. Line 4 station opened in September 2009, together with the other stations on the line. It is located in the Caishikou neighbourhood of the Xicheng District.

Around the station
 Niujie Mosque located on Niujie
 Caishikou Execution Grounds

First & Last Time
Beijing West Railway Station — Hua zhuang
The first train 5:39
The last train 23:24
Hua zhuang — Beijing West Railway Station
The first train 5:43
The last train 22:58

Station Layout 
Both the line 4 and 7 stations have underground island platforms.

Exits 
There are 6 exits, lettered A, C, D, E, F, and G. Exits A, E, and G are accessible.

Gallery

References

External links
 

Railway stations in China opened in 2009
Beijing Subway stations in Xicheng District